A white paper is an authoritative report or guide that helps solve a problem, or a form of marketing communication.

White paper may also refer to:
 White Paper (film), a 2010 Iranian animated film
 The White Paper, a report by the National Academy of Sciences on emergency medical services
 Palestine white paper, one of six policy papers issue by the British government regarding the situation in the Palestine.
 1969 White Paper, a policy paper issue by the Canadian government attempting to abolish the Indian Act.
 White Paper on El Salvador, a work of propaganda issued by the US State Department in 1981 to justify intervention in El Salvador and Nicaragua.

See also 
 
 Paper